Persatuan Sepakbola Indonesia Bojonegoro commonly known as Persibo, is an Indonesian football club in Bojonegoro, East Java. They currently compete in the Liga 3. In 2010, Persibo played in the Indonesia Super League (the top tier Indonesian football league) after winning Divisi Utama (Second Tier division) previous season. In 2012, Persibo won Piala Indonesia (Indonesian Cup) after defeating Semen Padang in the final and represented Indonesia in 2013 AFC Cup.

Manager history
 Jamrawi (2001–03)
 Sanusi Rahman (2003–06)
 Hanafi (2006)
 Gusnul Yakin (2006–08)
 Sartono Anwar (2008–10)
 Paulo Camargo (2011–2012)
 Gusnul Yakin (2013)
 Bambang Pramudji (2014–2017)
 I Putu Gede (2017)

Players

Current squad

Former foreign players

AFC
 Kim Harrys
 Adam Harrys
 Li Zhixing
 Stanley Bernard
 Kim Kang-hyun
 Mekan Nasyrow

CONMEBOL
 Gustavo Ortiz
 Julio Alcorsé
 Marcelo Cirelli
 Carlos Eduardo
 Lexe
 Victor da Silva

CAF
 Amos Marah
 Alexander Robinson
 Morris Bayour Power
 Varney Pas Boakay

Honours

Domestic
League
Divisi Satu/Divisi Utama
Winners (2): 2007, 2009-10
Divisi Dua
Winners: 2004

Cups
Piala Indonesia
Winners: 2012
Community Shield
Runners-up: 2013

AFC (Asian competitions)
 AFC Cup
2013 – Group stage

Supporters
Persibo Bojonegoro have always enjoyed loyal and passionate support. Most fans come from Bojonegoro and around Part west of East Java. They called themselves as Boromania or Bojonegoro Mania. their great enemy is the supporters club Persela Lamongan, LA Mania. but enjoy Boromania very friendly with the two groups of supporters who are very hostile, namely, Bonek and Aremania as well.

References

External links
 Official site
 Liga Indonesia Official site
 Profile at national-football-teams.com
 Profile at goal.com
 Liga Primer
 

Football clubs in East Java
Football clubs in Indonesia
Indonesian Premier Division winners
Association football clubs established in 1949
1949 establishments in Indonesia